Marilyn Ryan may be:
Marilyn J. Ryan, Montana politician
Marilyn Ryan (California politician)